John Bernard Christian Eckstorm (October 22, 1873 – October 28, 1964) was an American football player and coach.  He played college football as a halfback at Dartmouth College from 1894 to 1897 and was captain of the 1897 Dartmouth football team as a senior.  Eckstorm served as two stints as the head football coach at Kenyon College in Gambier, Ohio, in 1898 and from 1903 to 1904, and one stint at Ohio State University, from 1899 to 1901.

Early life and playing career

Eckstorm grew up in Chicago and attended Lake View High School there, where excelled in athletics, captaining the football team for two years, playing baseball, and setting the Chicago interscholastic record in the broad jump.  Eckstorm moved on to Dartmouth College, where he played college football for four seasons, from 1894 to 1897, as a halfback.  He was elected as captain of the 1897 Dartmouth football team for his senior by his teammates, succeeding Walter McCornack.

Coaching career
Eckstorm served as the head coach at Ohio State University from 1899 to 1901, compiling a record of 22–4–3.  Eckstorm was the first Ohio State Buckeyes football coach to have a winning record at the school. In his first season in 1899, the Buckeyes went 9–0–1 giving Ohio State their first undefeated season in school history.  The next season, he led Ohio State to a tie against Michigan in the second meeting of the two schools.

During the 1901 season, captain John Sigrist endured an injury during a game with Western Reserve University.  Forty-eight hours later, he was pronounced dead and it very nearly led to the abolishment of football at Ohio State.  It remains the only death because of injuries sustained during play in Ohio State history.  A resolution to cancel the remainder of the season was defeated by an 18–8 vote, but it proved difficult for the Buckeyes to emotionally recover.  They lost three of the last four games and Coach Eckstorm decided to leave his post at the end of the season.

Late life and death
Eckstorm was later a physician in Ohio and Chief Medical Officer at the Ohio Penitentiary.  He died on  October 28, 1964, at his daughter's home in Marysville, Ohio.

Head coaching record

References

External links
 

1873 births
1964 deaths
19th-century players of American football
American football halfbacks
Dartmouth Big Green football players
Kenyon Lords football coaches
Ohio State Buckeyes football coaches
People from Blue Earth County, Minnesota
Sportspeople from Chicago
Players of American football from Chicago
Physicians from Ohio